The Khurja Gharana is a musical apprenticeship tribe of Hindustani classical music. Known for being Azmat Hussain Khan's and Jitendra Abhisheki's musical lineage, the gharana emerged from a family of Nauharbani musicians and gained recognition during the life of Altaf Hussain Khan who was born at Khurja.

With its own distinct aesthetics, stylings, practices, and repertoire, the gharana melded with Jaipur-Atrauli, Agra, Qawwal Bacchon, Atrauli, and Hapur musical traditions.

History

Etymology

Recent Developments

Ancestry

Geography

Pedagogical Genealogy
The following visualization is based on several historical accounts.

Ancestral Pedagogy of Khurja Gharana

Early Pedagogy

Recent Pedagogy

Overview

Aesthetic Approaches

Philosophy

Specialty ragas and compositions

Exponents

19th Century

20th Century

21st Century

References

Gharana